Fidelis Thaliath (1929 – 2008), popularly known as Doctoramma (Mother Doctor), was an Indian nun, gynecologist and social reformer who worked among the destitute people in Delhi. She was declared Servant of God in 2021.

Early years 
Fidelis Thaliath was born as Kochuthresia in 1929 in Puthanpally, a village in the then Cochin State, now part of the south Indian state of Kerala to Joseph Thaliath and Mariamkkutty. She joined the religious congregation, Sisters of the Destitute in 1952 and took the perpetual vow of chastity in 1956. In 1964, she moved to Chicago where she joined the Loyola University to obtain a medical degree in Gynecology. Subsequently, she returned to India to start her career as a medical professional in Holy Angels' Nursing Home in Delhi but returned to Chicago in 1973 to complete her master's degree in 1977.

Social career 
Returning to India in 1977, she founded the Jivodya Hospital, which was built on a plot of land in Ashok Vihar in Delhi, bought with a gift of  1000 she had received for purchasing a car and served there in the Department of Gynecology. During her time in Delhi, she was involved in several social activities, focusing on helping the destitute people and founded two centres, one to house the poor women in Vikaspuri and the other, a home for the handicapped children in Ghaziabad.

Spirituality 
Hers was a life set aside for the underprivileged and the needy. Nourished by the sacrament of eucharist and rosary in her hands, she walked through the streets of Delhi, caring for the sick and the abandoned. She not only took care of them and provided medicines, but also prayed for them. Her selfless service brought meaning to the lives of so many poor patients, especially the lepers.

Thaliath died on January 17, 2008, at the age of 79. Loyola University Chicago, her alma mater, have since instituted a scholarship, Class Of 1960 Sister Fidelis Thaliath, MD, Medical Student Scholarship Fund, in her honor.

Cause of canonization 
Thaliath is reported to have performed several miracles which are being considered and verified by Syro-Malabar Catholic Church and her social and religious contributions were considered by the church while deciding upon initiation of her canonization process. As the first step towards canonization, she was declared Servant of God by the Syro-Malabar Catholic Church on 14 July 2021 in the archdiocese of Faridabad by the Archbishop Mar Kuriakose Bharanikulangara.

See also 

 George Vakayil
 Mathew Kavukattu
 Antony Thachuparambil
 Eliswa Vakayil

Notes

References

External links
 

1929 births
2008 deaths
Eastern Catholic Servants of God
Indian Eastern Catholics
20th-century venerated Christians
Indian social reformers
Indian Servants of God
People from Ernakulam district
Malayali people
Indian gynaecologists
Loyola University Chicago alumni
21st-century venerated Christians